Amar Garibović (7 September 1991 – 7 September 2010) was a Serbian cross-country skier who had competed since 2004. He finished 80th in the 15 km event at the 2010 Winter Olympics in Vancouver.

Garibović finished 109th in the individual sprint at the FIS Nordic World Ski Championships 2009 in Liberec.

His lone win was at a 10 km event in Bosnia and Herzegovina in 2009.

Garibović died in a car crash in Croatia on 7 September 2010, the day of his 19th birthday. Travelling eastbound on the A3 motorway on the way back home following a FIS roller skiing event in Oroslavje, the van containing Garibović, his brother Amor, their father Murat, and another skier Ajlan Rastić reportedly blew a tire in full speed on the stretch of the road near the village of Sredanci, thus losing control and overturning several times.

References

External links
 
 
 
 
 

1991 births
2010 deaths
People from Sjenica
Cross-country skiers at the 2010 Winter Olympics
Olympic cross-country skiers of Serbia
Serbian male cross-country skiers
Road incident deaths in Croatia

Bosniaks of Serbia